Los Angeles Media Fund (LAMF) is an entertainment and media company involved in producing and financing feature films, unscripted and scripted television, sports, music, theatre and live events.

Overview 
Launched in 2014 by Jeffrey Soros and Simon Horsman, Los Angeles Media Fund is a multi-faceted entertainment company with a primary focus on the development, financing, and production of features, documentaries and television. The firm also has several strategic investments with partners in scripted and unscripted television, live events, and recently launched a sports management firm.

Filmography

Completed 

 {| class="wikitable"
!Year
!Title
|-
| 2023 
| Cora Bora
|-
| 2021 
| The Exchange
|-
| rowspan="2" |2020
|Lance Oppenheim's Some Kind of Heaven
|-
|Josephine Decker's Shirley
|-
| rowspan="3" |2018
|Juliet, Naked
|-
|United Skates
|-
|Step Sisters
|-
| rowspan="3" |2017
|Shot in the Dark
|-
|The Space Between Us
|-
|The Bye Bye Man
|-
| rowspan="1" |2016
|Dark Crimes
|-
|}

References 

Film production companies of the United States
Entertainment companies based in California
Companies based in Beverly Hills, California
American companies established in 2014
Entertainment companies established in 2014
2014 establishments in California